Sylviorthorhynchus is a genus of small passerine birds  belonging to the ovenbird family Furnariidae.  They are somewhat similar to birds of the tit family in their shape and feeding behaviour. They have short rounded wings, short pointed bills and are mainly brown in colour. Their nests are built in holes or in the old nests of other birds.

Species list
 Des Murs's wiretail, Sylviorthorhynchus desmurii
 Tawny tit-spinetail, Sylviorthorhynchus yanacensis

References
Jaramillo, Alvaro; Burke, Peter & Beadle, David (2003). Field Guide to the Birds of Chile, Christopher Helm, London.
South American Classification Committee (2007) A Classification of the Bird Species of South America, part 6. Archived June 25, 2007.

Bird genera